JL Darling is a Tacoma, Washington business founded 1916. It is known for "Rite in the Rain" waterproof paper pads. The first paper processing formula, using zinc, white varnish and wheat flour, was patented in 1917 or 1920 by Jerry L. Darling who was originally from the Grays Harbor area. The pads originally supplied timbermen in the rainy Pacific Northwest but the company branched out and now a third of its sales are to the U.S. military, with products including field notebooks and waterproof pens. Other specialty products include notebooks for news reporters, contractors and firefighters; for ranchers to track calving; OSHA industrial compliance forms, field interview forms for police, field diagrams for soccer coaches, expedition notebooks for mountain climbers, notebooks for underwater use by scuba divers; and waterproof military zeroing and bullseye targets.

The Tacoma factory burned down in 1986. The company found that although its finished products had been soaked with water by the fire fighting effort, they were undamaged, and were trimmed and used for four or five months of inventory after the fire.

References

External links

Companies based in Tacoma, Washington
1916 establishments in Washington (state)